Diomira Jacobini (25 May 1899 – 13 September 1959) was an Italian film actress of the silent era. She was the younger sister of actress Maria Jacobini.

Selected filmography
 The Shadow of Her Past (1915)
 The Rose of Granada (1916)
 The House of Pulcini (1924)
 Maciste's American Nephew (1924)
 The Dealer from Amsterdam (1925)
 The Alternative Bride (1925)
 The Last Night (1928)
 Don Manuel, the Bandit (1929)
 The Last Adventure (1932)

References

Bibliography
 Goble, Alan. The Complete Index to Literary Sources in Film. Walter de Gruyter, 1999.

External links

1899 births
1959 deaths
Italian film actresses
Italian silent film actresses
20th-century Italian actresses
Actresses from Rome